Mischel is a surname. Notable people with the surname include:

Paul Mischel (born 1962), American physician-scientist 
Walter Mischel (1930–2018), Austrian-born American psychologist

See also
Michel (name)